The Aspy Fault  is a strike-slip fault that runs through 40 km of Cape Breton, Nova Scotia and is often thought to be a part of the Cabot Fault/ Great Glen Fault system of Avalonia. Part of the fault runs through Cape Breton Highlands National Park. This fault runs southward from Cape North through the Margaree Valley. The Aspy River and the upper section of the Margaree River follows the trace of the fault. Evidence shows movement in this fault dating back to the Ordovician period when it was probably created when two continental plates collided and pushed the seafloor upwards, also creating the Appalachian Mountains. Erosion and the presence of this fault have created much of the scenery known today as the Cape Breton Highlands.

References

External links 
Wilkie Sugarloaf
The Natural History of Nova Scotia: 200 Highlands
Cape Breton Highlands National Park of Canada: Faults and Canyons in Cape Breton Highlands National Park

Natural history of Nova Scotia
Geology of Nova Scotia
Strike-slip faults